Baník is a Slovak word meaning "miner". Since the 1950s it has been part of the name of various sports clubs in Czechoslovakia associated mostly with coal mining regions. In Poland, the same practice was conducted with the name górnik. 

Baník still serves as a name of various sport clubs in the Czech Republic and Slovakia:

Sports clubs in the Czech Republic
 FC Baník Ostrava, from Ostrava
 FC Baník Ostrava (women)
 FK Pelikán Děčín, known as DSO Baník Děčín 1953–1957 and TJ Baník Děčín 1957–1958, from Děčín
 MFK Havířov, formerly known as Baník Havířov, from Havířov
 SK Kladno, known as DSO Baník Kladno 1953–1958 and TJ Baník Kladno 1960–1961, from Kladno
 FK Baník Most 1909, from Most
 DHK Baník Most
 SK Sigma Olomouc, known as DSO Baník MŹ Olomouc 1953–1960, from Olomouc
 SFC Opava, known as TJ Baník Opava 1953–1958, from Opava
 FK Baník Ratíškovice, from Ratíškovice
 FK Baník Sokolov, from Sokolov
Stadion FK Baník Sokolov
 MFK Vítkovice, known as Baník Vítkovice 1953–1957, from Vítkovice
 HCB Karviná, or Handball Club Baník Karviná

Sports clubs in Slovakia
 FC Baník Prievidza, 1954–1994 and 1998–2003, from Prievidza
 BC Prievidza, known as Baník Cígeľ Prievidza 1964–2004
 TJ Baník Ružiná, from Ružiná
 FC Baník Veľký Krtíš
 TJ Baník Kalinovo
 TJ Baník Ružiná
TJ Baník Stadium
 MBK Baník Handlová

See also

 Baníkov, a mountain in Slovakia

Slovak words and phrases
Sports teams in Slovakia
Sports teams in Czechoslovakia
Sports teams in the Czech Republic